Tori Foster (born 1982) is a Canadian artist and filmmaker, known for her new media works. She is most noted for her documentary film 533 Statements, which was cowinner with Denis Langlois' film Amnesia: The James Brighton Enigma of the award for Best Canadian Feature Film at the 2006 Inside Out Film and Video Festival.

Academic career
Foster is an assistant professor of art at California State University, Northridge.

See also
 List of female film and television directors
 List of lesbian filmmakers
 List of LGBT-related films directed by women

References

1982 births
Artists from Ontario
Living people
California State University, Northridge faculty
Film directors from Ontario
Canadian women artists
Canadian contemporary artists
Canadian LGBT artists
LGBT film directors
Canadian documentary film directors
Canadian women film directors
Canadian women documentary filmmakers